Teklewold Atnafu (born on 26 October 1963) is an Ethiopian politician who governed National Bank of Ethiopia for nearly two decades. Teklewold is serving as a board member for the Commercial Bank of Ethiopia since 2020.

Early life 
Teklewold was born in Areka, Wolayita, Ethiopia. He completed his primary and secondary school in his hometown and Sodo respectively. He attended Addis Abeba University and studied his first and second degree in Statistics.

Career 
Teklewold governed the National Bank of Ethiopia since 2000s to 18 June 2018. He is believed to be the longest serving governor of the bank. Aby Ahmed appointed him as a chair person of Commercial Bank of Ethiopia since February 2020. He is also a Financial affairs sector advisor of the Prime minister.

References 

Living people
People from Wolayita Zone
1963 births
Ethiopian politicians
Governors of National Bank of Ethiopia